Birpurush is a 2010 Bengali drama staged by Kolkata based theatre group Swapnasandhani and directed by Kaushik Sen.

Plot 
The drama is inspired by Rabindranath Tagore's poem Birpurush, it was not a children's play (though it was misinterpreted like that). The play had some amount of violence in it. The story was based on contemporary social and political condition of West Bengal. A wounded soldier and a Maoist get trapped in a forest and there they both claim to be Birpurush (brave man). There were some characters like 'Kishen Kanhaiya', 'Buddhadesh' and 'Monmohinidesh' which mocked real life personalities. In this play Kaushik Sen acted as himself and it is a self-critical character.

Credits

Cast 
 Kanchan Mullick
 Riddhi Sen
 Kaushik Sen

Crew 
 Direction: Kaushik Sen
 Production: Swapnasandhani
 Inspired by: Birpurush of Rabindranath Tagore
 Script: Sumitro Bandyopadhyay

See also 
 Bohurupee

References

External links 
 Birpurush Telegraph (Calcutta) review

2010 plays
Indian plays
Bengali-language plays